Martin Lipták (born March 23, 1964) is a Czech handball coach, he currently coaches the Czech Republic men's national handball team and will participate at the 2012 European Men's Handball Championship held in Serbia.

References

Living people
1964 births
Slovak male handball players